Basket Case 3: The Progeny is a 1991 American comedy horror slasher film written and directed by Frank Henenlotter. It is the third and final installment of the Basket Case series. It was released on DVD by 20th Century Fox Home Entertainment in 2004. Synapse Films released a new DVD on October 9, 2012.

Plot
After crudely trying to sew his monstrous former conjoined twin Belial back onto his side at the end of the previous film, Duane Bradley is reseparated from Belial and put in a straitjacket and padded cell in Granny Ruth's haven for "unique" (deformed) individuals. After several months of captivity, Duane is released by Granny Ruth, who is preparing to take everyone on a road trip to the home of her ex-husband, Doctor Hal Rockwell, who will help in giving birth to Belial's equally misshapen girlfriend Eve's babies; before leaving for the trip, Granny Ruth sternly tells Duane to stay away from Belial, who has stopped speaking to Duane telepathically after Duane's attempt to put them back together.

While traveling via bus to Hal's house in Peachtree County, the group stops at a drug store, where Granny Ruth meets local sheriff Andrew Griffin while Duane, attempting to wriggle out a bus window, meets the sheriff's daughter Opal, whom he tries to convince to help Belial and him escape. Before Duane can talk to Opal any further, Granny Ruth returns, boards the bus, and heads back on track to Hal's house, having sweet-talked Sheriff Griffin into letting her leave despite the bus being illegally parked.

Eventually reaching Hal's home, Duane escapes out a window after Granny Ruth decides to give him a chance and removes his straitjacket; as Duane is imprisoned by Opal and several officers in the local jail, Eve prepares to give birth, which is complicated when Belial mauls Hal, the sight of him in surgical attire causing him to remember his original separation from Duane. With Hal incapacitated, Belial is drugged to calm him down, and the birth of Eve and his 12 children is overseen by Little Hal, the multiarmed and blob-like prodigy son of Hal and Granny Ruth. Shortly after Eve and Belial's children are born, Deputies Bailey and Baxter break into the Rockwell house, having realized a million-dollar reward has been offered for the capture of both Duane and Belial. While the freaks party, Bailey and Baxter find the sleeping babies, and mistaking the groggy Eve for Belial, shoot and kill her before fleeing with the babies when the freaks come after them.

At the police station, Sheriff Griffin finds his daughter in the midst of trying to seduce Duane in dominatrix attire and sends her away, shortly before Bailey and Baxter arrive with the babies. Griffin sends Bailey and Baxter back to their homes and goes off to see what is going on at the Rockwell residence, leaving Officers Brennan, Banner, and Brody in charge of the station. Breaking into the Rockwell house, Sheriff Griffin finds Granny Ruth and the freaks in the midst of mourning the dead Eve, and the sheriff, disturbed by the sight of the freaks and Little Hal, hurries back to the station, which Belial had broken into. As Belial attacks Brennan, Banner, and Brody, Opal releases Duane from his cell, hoping he can stop Belial. Belial kills Brennan by crushing his throat (causing his eyes and teeth to pop out) and rips Banner's head off before trying to maul Brody, who accidentally blasts Opal (who crushes one of the babies in her death throes) with his shotgun prior to having his neck snapped by Belial. Putting Belial in his basket, Duane runs from the station just as Sheriff Griffin appears and opens fire, injuring Belial. Wanting to help Belial reclaim his babies and take revenge on the remaining police, Duane makes up with Belial and has Little Hal construct a robotic exoskeleton for him, which Belial uses to butcher Bailey and Baxter.

At Eve's funeral, Granny Ruth rallies the grieving freaks, and they all travel to the police station, where Sheriff Griffin, grieving over his dead daughter, offers them a deal: Belial for the babies. Granny Ruth agrees to the sheriff's offer and tells him to show up at an abandoned factory on the outskirts of town for the trade; after the meeting at the station, Granny Ruth and the freaks ransack a fast-food restaurant, scaring away all the customers, much to the chagrin of the staff.

Arriving at the factory with the babies and a shotgun for protection, Sheriff Griffin is ambushed by Belial and the two fight; Belial has the upper hand due to his exoskeleton. After seemingly killing Sheriff Griffin with a blow to the head from his mechanical claw, Belial goes to retrieve his children, but the recovered sheriff ambushes and trips him. Flailing about in his armor, Belial scores a hit against Sheriff Griffin, who is swarmed and killed by the babies when he falls into their cradle.

With the babies reclaimed, Granny Ruth, Duane, Belial, and the freaks attack a talk show entitled Renaldo; Belial mauls the titular host. Speaking into the camera, Granny Ruth tells the world that the freaks will no longer hide in the shadows and will fight back if oppressed.  She finishes her speech by telling everyone to have a nice day.

Cast 
 Kevin Van Hentenryck as Duane Bradley
 Annie Ross as Granny Ruth
 Jackson Faw as Bailey
 Jim Grimshaw as Baxter
 Jerry G. White as Banner
 Dan Biggers as Uncle Hal
 Jim O'Doherty as Little Hal
 Tina Louise Hilbert as Opal
 Tom Tolan as Belial Bradley (voice; uncredited)
 Regina Stewart as Eve and Belial's babies (voices; uncredited)

Reception 
Variety wrote, "Henenlotter's mix of wild over-acting, cartoon color scheme and heavy-handed message regarding tolerance is tough to take for the uninitiated. His fans will enjoy seeing the growing menagerie of creatures, including the cute/grotesque progeny."  Ian Jane of DVD Talk rated it 3/5 stars and called it "far from Henenlotter's best film" but "a lot of fun".

See also 

 List of films featuring powered exoskeletons

References

External links
 
 

1992 films
1992 horror films
American slasher films
American comedy horror films
American sequel films
American monster movies
Films about twin brothers
Films directed by Frank Henenlotter
Puppet films
Parasitic twinning in culture
Films scored by Joe Renzetti
1990s English-language films
1990s slasher films
1990s American films